Georges Honein (born 15 July 1963) is a Lebanese former cyclist. He competed in the road race at the 1988 Summer Olympics.

References

External links
 

1963 births
Living people
Lebanese male cyclists
Olympic cyclists of Lebanon
Cyclists at the 1988 Summer Olympics
Place of birth missing (living people)